Allahabad Chheoki Junction railway station, officially Prayagraj Chheoki Junction railway station (station code: PCOI),) is one of the major railways stations (besides Prayagraj Junction railway station) located in Allahabad district. Chheoki is at a distance of 10 km from Prayagraj Junction on the Howrah–Delhi main line. Trains that bypass Prayagraj Junction and which come from Jabalpur and go towards Mughalsarai usually stop at Chheoki. To reduce the load on the main junction, trains were shifted to Chheoki.

History
The station was constructed to decongest Prayagraj Junction and provide a separate route for trains to southern India and Jabalpur which originate from eastern India and Mughalsarai. A delay of more than 30 minutes for an engine change at Allahabad is thus avoided. This allows trains on the New Delhi–Howrah route to run punctually since scarce platform space at Prayagraj Junction is freed up.

Amenities
The station is a B-class station and part of North Central Railways under the Allahabad railway division.

Some popular trains that stop at Chheoki are Bhagmati Express, Khwaja Garib Nawaz Madar–Kolkata Express, Bhagalpur–Ajmer Express, Chambal Express, Mahanagari Express, Shipra Express, Sanghamithra Express Tapti Ganga Express, Howrah–Mumbai Mail and Pune–Danapur Superfast Express, Bhagalpur Antyodaya Express, Humsafar Express, and Mahamana Express. Trains plying between Manikpur–Jabalpur–Itarsi, Manikpur–Jhansi–Gwalior, Manikpur–Katni–Bhopal–Indore and Manikpur–Nagpur–Gondia–Secunderabad–Yesvantpur transit through Cheoki.

The station currently lacks facilities like porters, however efforts are being made to convert the station to a satellite hub with better passenger amenities since several trains to southern India transit through this station.

References

Railway stations in Allahabad district
Allahabad railway division